Under United States law, a patent is a right granted to the inventor of a (1) process, machine, article of manufacture, or composition of matter, (2) that is new, useful, and non-obvious. A patent is the right to exclude others, for a limited time (usually, 20 years) from profiting of a patented technology without the consent of the patent-holder. Specifically, it is the right to exclude others from:
making,
using, 
selling, 
offering for sale, 
importing, 
inducing others to infringe, 
applying for an FDA approval, and/or 
offering a product specially adapted for practice of the patent.

United States patent law is codified in Title 35 of the United States Code, and authorized by the U.S. Constitution, in Article One, section 8, clause 8, which states:

Patent law is designed to encourage inventors to disclose their new technology to the world by offering the incentive of a limited-time monopoly on the technology. For U.S. utility patents, this limited-time term of patent is 20 years from the earliest patent application filing date (but this term can be extended via patent term adjustment). After the patent term expires, the new technology enters the public domain and is free for anyone to use.

Substantive law
Some of the most important patent law is found under Title 35 of the United States Code. The "patentability" of inventions (defining the types things that qualify for patent protection) is defined under Sections 100–105. Most notably, section 101 sets out "subject matter" that can be patented; section 102 defines "novelty" and "statutory bars" to patent protection; section 103 requires that an invention must not only be new, but also "non-obvious".

Other patent law is found in a variety of sources, including federal court decisions that have accumulated over more than 200 years.  The U.S. Patent and Trademark Office also has its own court system, the Patent Trial and Appeal Board (formerly known as the Board of Patent Appeals and Interferences), that specifically handles appeals of examiners' refusals to grant patents, and various other matters pertaining specifically to the USPTO.  Some Patent Trial and Appeal Board opinions will be considered precedent, and will affect future patent applications.

Patentable subject matter (§101)
To be patent eligible subject matter, an invention must meet two criteria. First, it must fall within one of the four statutory categories of acceptable subject matter: process, machine, manufacture, or composition of matter. Second, it must not be directed to subject matter encompassing a judicially recognized exception: laws of nature, physical phenomena, and abstract ideas.

Novelty (§102)

Section 102 of the patent act defines the "novelty" requirement. The novelty requirement prohibits patenting a technology that is already available to the public. Specifically, 35 U.S.C. 102 states:
 

For a technology to be "anticipated" (and therefore patent-ineligible) under 35 U.S.C. 102, the prior art reference must teach every aspect of the claimed invention either explicitly or impliedly. "A claim is anticipated only if each and every element as set forth in the claim is found, either expressly or inherently described, in a single prior art reference." Verdegaal Bros. v. Union Oil Co. of California, 814 F.2d 628, 631 (Fed. Cir. 1987).

Obviousness (§103)

To be patentable, a technology must not only be "new" but also "non-obvious." A technology is obvious (and therefore ineligible for a patent) if a person of "ordinary skill" in the relevant field of technology, as of the filing date of the patent application, would have thought the technology was obvious. Put differently, an invention that would have been obvious to a person of ordinary skill at the time of the invention is not patentable. Specifically, 35 U.S.C. 103 states:

The non-obviousness requirement does not demand that the prior art be identical to the claimed invention. It is enough that the prior art can somehow be modified in order to teach the claimed technology. So long as the modification of the prior art (or combination of several prior art references) would have been obvious to a person of ordinary skill in the art (PHOSITA) at the time the application was filed, the applied-for technology will be considered obvious and therefore patent-ineligible under 35 U.S.C. §103.

As the practice of the USPTO and US Federal Courts showed later, the PHOSITA criterion turned out to be too ambiguous in practice. The practical approach was developed soon by the US Supreme Court in Graham v.

Patent application procedure

Patent applications can be filed at the United States Patent and Trademark Office. Prior to June 7, 1995, the duration of a US utility patent was 17 years from patent issuance.  Since June 7, 1995, the duration of the US utility patent is 20 years from the earliest effective filing date.  However, patent term adjustment or extension are possible if the USPTO fails to issue a patent within 3 years after filling the full application, subject to various conditions on the applicant.

The rules for drafting and filing a patent application are set out in the Manual of Patent Examination Procedure (MPEP).

Pre-grant publication (PG Pub)
Since the American Inventors Protection Act, the United States Patent and Trademark Office publishes patent applications 18 months after the earliest priority application (which often is a provisional application) is filed. This time limit can be extended under certain circumstances, for an additional fee. The applications may be published before a patent has been granted on them if the patent is not granted within the 18-month time frame. Applicants can opt out of publication if the applications will not be prosecuted internationally.

Patent infringement, enforcement and litigation

U.S. International Trade Commission (ITC) 
In the United States, a patent holder may wish to pursue a cause of action in the United States International Trade Commission (ITC) instead of, or in addition to, the court system. The ITC is an agency of the U.S. federal government empowered to enforce patent holders' rights under Section 337 of the Tariff Act of 1930. In contrast to courts, which have a wide range of remedies at their disposal, including monetary damages, the ITC can grant only two forms of remedy: exclusion orders barring infringing products from being imported into the United States, and cease-and-desist orders preventing the defendants (known as respondents) in the ITC action from importing infringing products into the United States. In addition, the ITC can grant temporary relief, similar to a preliminary injunction in U.S. federal court, which prevents importation of allegedly infringing products for the duration of the ITC proceeding. In some cases, this may provide a quicker resolution to a patent owner's problems.

Utilization and importance
A survey of 12 industries from 1981 to 1983 shows that patent utilization is strong across all industries in the United States, with 50 percent or more patentable inventions being patented.

However, this is not to say that all industries believe their inventions have relied on the patent system or believe it is a necessity to introduce and develop inventions. Another survey for the same time period show that, of those 12 same industries, only two—pharmaceuticals and chemicals—believe thirty percent or more of their patentable inventions would not have been introduced or developed without having patent protection. All others—petroleum, machinery, fabricated metal products, primary metals, electrical equipment, instruments, office equipment, motor vehicles, rubber, and textiles—have a percentage of twenty-five or lower, with the last four of those industries believing none of their inventions relied on the patent system to be introduced or developed.

See also
 Timeline of United States inventions

Concepts

 All elements test
 Assignor estoppel
 Continuing patent application
 Design patent
 Doctrine of inherency
 Doctrine of repair and reconstruction
 Duty of candor
 Duty of disclosure
 Exhausted combination doctrine
 First-sale doctrine
 Flash of genius
 Incredible utility
 Inequitable conduct
 Information disclosure statement (IDS)
 Inter partes review
 Interference proceeding
 Large entity status
 Markman hearing

 Micro entity status
 Non-provisional patent application
 On-sale bar
 Petition to make special
 Printed matter (patent law)
 Prosecution disclaimer
 Prosecution history estoppel
 Provisional application
 Reduction to practice
 Reissue application
 Small entity status
 Statutory Invention Registration
 Submarine patent
 Transitional phrase
 United States Defensive Publication
 Utility
 X-Patent

Legislation
 28 USC 1498. This statute allows the US government to override patent protection (or contract another entity to do so) for public-use purposes. The patent owner can sue for limited compensation.
 Invention Secrecy Act (1951)
 Patent Act of 1790, First Patent Act - April 7, 1790
 Patent Act of 1836
Patent Act of 1870
 Patent Act of 1952
 Patent Reform Act of 2005
 Patent Reform Act of 2007
 Patent Reform Act of 2009
Plant Patent Act (1930)

Other
 American Intellectual Property Law Association (AIPLA)
 Board of Patent Appeals and Interferences (BPAI)
 Confederate Patent Office
 List of top United States patent recipients
Copyright law of the United States
 United States Court of Appeals for the Federal Circuit (CAFC)
 United States Court of Customs and Patent Appeals (CCPA)
 United States Patent and Trademark Office (USPTO)
 United States Patents Quarterly (USPQ)
 United States trademark law

References

External links

 United States Patent and Trademark Office (USPTO) web site:
 Consolidated laws (pdf, 1MB)
 Glossary of patent terms
 Search US patents
 US code, Title 35
 Sarah Burstein, Sarah R. Wasserman Rajec & Andres Sawicki, Patent Law: An Open-Access Casebook (2021)